Nino is considered to be an Italian masculine name that is in use throughout Italy as a diminutive form of several names such as Antonino, Giannino, Saturnino, Severino and all names ending in "-nino" as well as names such as Gaetano and Giovanni. It is used in other Mediterranean countries, e.g. Spain and Greece, as well as in nations where these countries have linguistic relations e.g. Latin-America.
Nino is considered to be a Georgian name of Assyrian origin that is a popular feminine name in Georgia with possible relation to the story of the husband of Semiramis, founder of the city of Nineveh. It was popularized due to the 4th century A.D. conversion of Georgia to Christianity by a Roman woman, Saint Nino, a relative of St. George, who came from Constantinople. In Slavic languages, the name is often written as Nina, a name that has multiple meanings.

Nino in Georgia

Nino, Princess of Mingrelia (1772 – 1847), Georgian princess royal
Nino Abesadze (born 1965), Georgian-Israeli politician
Nino Ananiashvili, birthname of Nina Ananiashvili (born 1963), Georgian ballerina
Nino Batsiashvili (born 1987), Georgian chess grandmaster
Nino Burjanadze (born 1964), Georgian politician
Nino Chavchavadze (1812 – 1857), Georgian princess
Nino Chkhartishvili (born 1999), Georgian footballer
Nino Chkuaseli (born 1988), Georgian footballer
Nino Dadeshkeliani (1890 – 1931), Georgian author
Nino Diasamidze (born 1992), Georgian gymnast
Nino Yakovlevna Dumbadze, known as Nina Dumbadze (1919 – 1983), Soviet discus athlete
Nino Gurieli (born 1961), Georgian chess player
Nino Gvenetadze (born 1964), Georgian magistrate
Nino Gvetadze, Georgian classical pianist
Nino Aleksi-Meskhishvili (1896 – 1956), Georgian actor
Nino Haratischwili (born 1983), Georgian writer
Nino Imeretinsky (1807-1847), Georgian royal princess
Nino Janjgava (born 1964), Georgian composer
Nino Katamadze (born 1972), Georgian jazz singer
Nino Khomeriki (born 1998), Georgia chess Woman Grandmaster 
Nino Khurtsidze (1975 – 2018), Georgian chess player
Nino Louarsabishvili (born 1977), Georgian tennis player
Nino Machaidze (born 1983), Georgian soprano
Nino Maisuradze (born 1982), Georgian chess Woman Grandmaster
Nino Nakashidze (1872 — 1963), Georgian writer
Nino Pasikashvili (born 1991), Georgian footballer
Nino Ramishvili (1910 - 2000), Georgian ballerina 
Nino Salia (1898 – 1992), Georgian historian and philologist
Nino Salukvadze (born 1969), Georgian shooter
Nino Sulaberidze, known by the stage name Nina Sublatti (born 1995), Georgian singer, songwriter, and model
Nino Surguladze (born 1977), Georgian mezzo-soprano
Nino Sutidze (born 1992), Georgian footballer
Nino Tsiklauri (born 1993), Georgian alpine skier
Nino Uchadze (born 1965), Georgian sport shooter
Saint Nino (c. 296 – c. 338 or 340), Greek Christian

Other notables

Given name

Nino (priestess), Athenian priestess
Nino Anderlini (1926–2004), Italian cross country skier
Nino Aquila (died 2013), Italian philatelist
Nino Assirelli (1925 – 2018), Italian racing cyclist
Nino Bertasio (born 1988), Italian golfer
Nino Besozzi (1901 – 1971), Italian actor
Nino Bibbia (1922 – 2013), Italian skeleton racer and bobsledder
Nino Bixio (1821 – 1873), Italian general, patriot and politician
Nino Bolzoni (1903 – 1972), Italian rower
Nino Borsari (1911 – 1996), Italian cyclist
Nino Bule (born 1976), Croatian football 
Nino Buonocore (born 1958), Italian singer-songwriter
Nino Castelli (1898–1925), Italian rower
Nino Cerruti (1930–2022), Italian fashion designer
Nino Cesarini, nickname of Antonio Cesarini (1889 – 1943), Italian model
Nino Cocchiarella (born 1933), Professor of logic and ontology
Nino Crisman (1911–1983), Italian actor and film producer
Nino Cristofori (1930 – 2015), Italian politician
Nino Da Silva (born 1979), Brazilian footballer
Nino DeFranco (born 1955) The DeFranco Family guitarist 
Nino Defilippis (1932 – 2010), Italian road bicycle racer
Nino del Arco (born 1958), lawyer and former child actor
Nino Del Pesco (1959 - 2019), American musician 
Nino Dirnbek (born 1990), Slovenian footballer
Nino Eller (fl. 1931–1942), Italian actor
Nino Everaers (born 1999), Dutch football player
Nino Fernandez (born 1984), German actor
Nino Ferrer stage name of Nino Agostino Arturo Maria Ferrari (1934–1998), Italian-French singer
Nino Frank (1904 − 1988), Italian-born French film critic
Nino Galović (born 1992), Croatian footballer
Nino Henry (born 1992), Antiguan cricketer
Nino Imperato, known as N. Imperato (born c. 1890s), Italian stamp forger
Nino Jakirović (born 1995), Bosnian-Herzegovinian footballer
Nino Kirov (1943 — 2008), Bulgarian chess Grandmaster
Nino Lombardo (died 2018), Italian politician
Nino Luraghi (born 1964), Italian historian
Nino Marcelli (c. 1890 – 1967), Italian composer and conductor
Nino Marchesini (1895 – 1961), Italian actor
Nino Marchetti (1909 – 1983), Italian actor
Nino Marković (born 1962), Croatian handball player
Nino Martini (1902 — 1976), Italian operatic tenor and actor
Nino Martoglio (1870 — 1921), Italian writer
Nino Muñoz, Chilean-Canadian photographer
Nino Navarra (1885 – 1917), Italian poet, writer and orator
Nino Niederreiter (born 1992), Swiss ice hockey player
Nino Nini (died 1564), Roman Catholic prelate
Nino Oliviero (1918 – 1980), Italian composer
Nino Pavese (1904 – 1979), Italian actor
Nino Pavić, nickname of Ninoslav Pavić, European businessman 
Nino Pecoraro (1899–1973), claimed and debunked Italian spiritualist medium 
Nino Pekarić (born 1982), Serbian footballer
Nino Pirrotta (1908 – 1998), Italian musicologist
Nino Pisano (fl. 1349 – 1368), Italian sculptor
Nino Pungaršek (born 1995), Slovenian footballer 
Nino Quevedo (1929 – 2006), Spanish screenwriter and film director
Nino Randazzo (1932 – 2019), Italian politician
Nino Raspudić (born 1975), Bosnian and Herzegovinian, philosopher, writer and political analyst
Nino Ricci (born 1959), Canadian novelist
Nino Konis Santana (1957 – 1998), East Timorese freedom fighter
Nino Sanzogno (1911 – 1983), Italian conductor and composer
Nino Schurter (born 1986), Swiss cross-country cyclist
Nino Segarra (born 1954), Puerto Rican musician
Nino Serdarušić (born 1996), Croatian tennis player
Nino Taranto (1907 – 1986), Italian film actor
Nino Terzo (1923 – 2005), Italian actor
Nino Vaccarella (1933–2021), Italian race car driver
Nino Valeri (1897 - 1978), Italian historian
Nino van den Beemt (born 1995), Dutch footballer
Nino Vingelli (1912 – 2003), Italian film actor
Nino Vitale (born 1970), American politician

Nickname/stagename

MC Nino, stagename of Terry Jones, vocalist and keyboardist for English music group Baby D (dance group)
Nino, nickname of Phillip Martin III (born 1968), African-American entertainer and businessman
Nino (footballer, born 1980), Spanish football striker
Nino (footballer, born 1983), Spanish football defender
Nino (footballer, born 1997), Brazilian football defender
Nino Alejandro, nickname of Christopher Caesar Alejandro (born 1976), Filipino musician
Nino Antonelli, nickname of Cosimo Antonelli (1925 – 2014), Italian water polo player
Nino Arrúa, nickname of Saturnino Arrúa (born 1949), Paraguayan footballer 
Nino Baskoro, nickname of Anindyo Baskoro, vocalist for Indonesian band RAN (Indonesian group)
Nino Benvenuti, nickname of Giovanni Benvenuti (born 1938), Italian boxer and actor
Nino Baragli, whose birthname is Giovanni Baragli (1925 – 2013), Italian film editor
Nino Bianco, nickname of Antonio Bianco (1951 – 2009), South African scientist
Nino Bongiovanni, nickname of Anthony Thomas Bongiovanni (1911 – 2009), American baseball player and manager 
Nino Bravo stage name of Luis Manuel Ferri Llopis (1944 – 1973), Spanish singer
Nino Buscató, also known as Francisco Buscató or Francisco Buscató (born 1940), Spanish basketball player and coach
Nino Castellini, nickname of Antonio Castellini (1951 – 1976), Italian boxer
Nino Castelnuovo, nickname of Francesco Castelnuovo (1936–2021), Italian actor 
Nino Costa, nickname of Giovanni Costa (1826 – 1903), Italian painter
Nino Cottone, nickname of Antonio Cottone (1904/1905 – 1956), Sicilian Mafioso
Nino Culotta, pen name of John O'Grady, (1907 – 1981), Australian writer
Nino D'Angelo, nickname of Gaetano D'Angelo (born 1957), Italian singer
Nino de Angelo, stagename of Domenico Gerhard Gorgoglione (born 1963), German singer 
Nino Durden, nickname Gino Floyd Durden (born 1963), American police officer
Nino Escalera, nickname of Saturnino Escalera Cuadrado (1929–2021), Puerto Rican baseball player
Nino Espinosa, nickname of Arnulfo Acevedo Espinosa (1953 – 1987), Dominican baseball player
Nino Farina, nickname of Giuseppe Antonio Farina (1906 – 1966), Italian racing driver
Nino Firetto, nickname of Anthony Edward Paolo Firetto (born 1957), British entertainer
Nino Frassica, nickname of Antonio Frassica (born 1950), Italian actor
Nino Gaggi, nickname of Anthony Frank Gaggi who was also known as "Antonino" (1925 – 1988), American organized crime figure
Nino Garris, nickname of Stefano Garris (born 1979), German basketball player
Nino Giarratano, nickname of Anthony Giarratano (born 1962), American baseball coach
Nino Giuffrè, nickname of Antonino Giuffrè (born 1945), Italian mafioso 
Nino Herman (Chananya) (born 1952), Israeli art-photographer
Nino Host-Venturi, whose real name is Giovanni Host-Venturi, (1892 – 1980), Italian fascist politician and historian
Nino Lema, nickname of Benign Lema Mejuto (born 1964), Spanish footballer
Nino Manfredi, nickname of Saturnino Manfredi (1921 – 2004), Italian actors
Nino Oxilia, whose birthname is Angelo Agostino Adolfo Oxilia (1889–1917), Italian playwright
Nino Paraíba, nickname of Severino de Ramos Clementino da Silva (born 1986), Brazilian footballer
Nino Porzio, whose birthname is Antonino Porzio (born 1972), Italian singer and actor 
Nino Pršeš, stagename of Vahidin Pršeš, Bosnian singer
Nino Ramsby (born Nina Ramsby, 1972), Swedish singer-songwriter
Nino Rešić, stage name of Nikola Rešić who was born Amir Rešić (1964 – 2007), Bosnian and Serbian singer
Nino Rota, nickname of Giovanni Rota Rinaldi (1911 – 1979), Italian composer
Nino Rotolo, nickname of Antonio Rotolo who is also known as Antonino (born 1946), Italian Mafia boss
Nino Rovelli, nickname of Angelo Rovelli (1917 – 1990), Italian bobsledder
Nino Salvo, nickname of Antonio Salvo (1929 – 1986), Italian businessman
Nino Santos, nickname of Alecsandro Aparecido dos Santos (born 1984), Brazilian footballer
Nino Scalia, nickname of Antonin Scalia (1936 – 2016), American jurist
Nino Schembri, nickname of Antônio Schembri (born 1974), Brazilian mixed martial artist
Nino Staffieri, also known as Bassano Staffieri (1931 – 2018), Italian bishop
Nino Tahvili, a nickname of Omid Tahvili (born 1970), Iranian gangster
Nino Tempo, whose birthname is Antonino LoTempio (born 1935), American entertainer
Nino Vieira, nickname of João Bernardo Vieira (1939 – 2009), Bissau-Guinean politician
Nino Visconti, whose real name is Ugolino Visconti (died 1298), Italian judge
Nino Xypolitas, whose birthname is Stefanos Sakellarios Xypolitas and is known professionally as Nino (born 1981), Greek singer
Nino Zec, nickname of Ninoslav Zec (born 1949), Yugoslav footballer
Nino, nickname for Thanapat Thaothawong also known as Thaiboy Digital (born 1994), Thai rapper.

Middle name
Egisto Nino Ceccatelli (born 1943), Italian photographer
Vittorio Nino Novarese (1907 – 1983), Italian costume designer

Surname
Carlos Santiago Nino (1943–1993), Argentine philosopher
Consiglio Di Nino (born 1938), Italian who served as a Canadian politician
Estaban Nino (born 1986), Argentine cricketer
Lynn Di Nino (born 1945), American artist

Fictional characters
Nino, the mage girl from the video game Fire Emblem: The Blazing Blade    
Nino, the younger brother of Victor from the comedy-drama film Raising Victor Vargas
Nino Falcone, one of the main characters from The Camorra Chronicles book series by author Cora Reilly.
Nino Lahiffe, a character in the animated series Miraculous: Tales of Ladybug & Cat Noir, the best friend of male protagonist Adrien Agreste
Nino Quincampoix, the romantic male lead character in the Amélie film and musical
Nino Sarratore, one of the main characters of the Neapolitan Novels series by Italian author Elena Ferrante (adapted on television for HBO, Rai and TIMvision in 2018 under the name of the first novel My Brilliant Friend).

to be reviewed
'Nino' a nickname of English artist John William Waterhouse RA

See also

9 (disambiguation)
Neno (name)
Nilo (name)
Nina (name)
Niño (name)
Ninos (name)
Nin (surname)
Ning (surname)
Nico (given name)
Nuno (given name)
Nuño, given name
NIO (disambiguation)
Niko (disambiguation)
Nano (disambiguation)
Nono (disambiguation)
Nini (disambiguation)
Santo Niño (disambiguation)
Nino and the Ebb Tides, musical group
Ninho

References

Georgian feminine given names
Italian masculine given names